The Antwerp diamond heist, dubbed the "heist of the century", was the largest diamond heist of all time. Since then, the heist was classified to be one of the largest robberies in history. Thieves stole loose diamonds, gold, silver and other types of jewelry valued at more than $100 million. It took place in Antwerp, Belgium, during the weekend of 15–16 February 2003. Though arrests were made and time was served, most of the diamonds stolen remain unrecovered.

Site
The vault that housed the diamonds is situated two floors below the main floor. It was protected by multiple security mechanisms, including a lock with 100 million possible combinations, infrared heat detectors, a seismic sensor, Doppler radar, and a magnetic field. The building itself had a private security force and was located in the heavily guarded and monitored Antwerp diamond district.

Robbery

Leonardo Notarbartolo had rented a sparsely furnished office for approximately 25,000 Belgian francs ($700) per month in the Antwerp World Diamond Centre. This was a technique pioneered by New York City-based criminal authority "Mr. Stan", Vojislav Stanimirović. It was first accomplished in New York's diamond center many years prior to this robbery. It included creating access to the safe deposit box located in the vault beneath the building. The method provided a tenant ID card offering 24-hour access to the building. There, he posed as an Italian diamond merchant to gain credibility. The robbery required eighteen months of preparation. The group used a variety of methods to overcome the security systems and left investigators confused as to how they had managed to successfully gain entry without triggering the security systems:
 The group conducted detailed surveillance of the Diamond Centre, using camera pens to take covert pictures of the Centre and the vault. Notarbartolo's frequent visits, under the guise of being a diamond merchant, caused security to become accustomed to his presence, and thus lax. 
 A small camera was hidden above the vault door by the group, being difficult to see when the ceiling lights were on. It would observe guards opening the door and record the combination he used. It would then broadcast its data to a sensor, which the group had hidden inside an ordinary-looking fire extinguisher in a nearby storage room in the centre (the extinguisher was fully functional, but had a watertight chamber inside housing electronics to receive the camera's data).
 The group allegedly practiced with a full-scale replica of the vault (Notarbartolo claims this was produced with help from a diamond trader insider)
 The day before the robbery, Notarbartolo visited the vault, posing as a routine visit. While inside, he quickly sprayed women's hair spray on the thermal-motion sensors (having practised the necessary motion for a swift spray), as the oil from the product was transparent but would temporarily insulate the sensor from thermal fluctuations in the room and the sensor would only be triggered if it detected both heat and motion. This would last many hours, but not permanently, and the group used it as a temporary measure until they could properly disable the sensor system. While the security camera recorded his actions, the guard was accustomed to his visits and did not pay attention.
 Notarbartolo remained in a nearby getaway vehicle during the robbery, listening to a police scanner, prepared to leave when the group was done. 
 The team wore plastic gloves to avoid leaving fingerprints. 
 To avoid the large number of security cameras in the area around the bank, the King of Keys picked the lock of an abandoned office building that adjoined the Diamond Centre, as it shared a private garden with the Diamond Centre that wasn't under video surveillance.
 The garden allowed access to a small balcony on the centre, which the group accessed with a ladder. An infrared sensor monitored the terrace but the Genius used a large, homemade polyester shield to hide his thermal signature as he approached the sensor and placed the shield in front of it, preventing it from detecting the group. He then disabled an alarm on the balcony's windows.
 Security cameras in the antechamber were covered with black plastic bags to allow the group to turn on the lights. 
 The vault door had a magnetic lock that consisted of two plates - when armed, they would trigger a magnetic field and when the door opened, the field would break, triggering an alarm. The Genius overcame this by using a custom-made aluminium plate, to which he attached heavy-duty double-sided adhesive tape to one side. He then stuck it on the two bolts and unscrewed them. While they were loose from their proper position, they were still side by side and generating a magnetic field. They were pivoted out of the way and taped to the antechamber wall. 
 The King of Keys had used video footage to successfully make a duplicate of the nearly impossible-to-duplicate, foot-long vault key. During the robbery, he knew that guards often visited the utility room just before opening the door and decided to investigate. Inside the unlocked room he found the vault key. He decided to steal the original key, as it would ensure the vault's manufacturers did not realise the key could be duplicated and indeed, it was not until Notarbartolo revealed this occurred that the police would know a duplicate had been created. The group turned off the antechamber lights before opening the vault door to avoid tripping light sensors in the vault.
 After the King of Keys picked the lock to the internal gate, the Monster, working in darkness, moved to the middle of the room (having practised the number of steps in the replica), reached up to the ceiling and pushed back a panel, locating the security system's inbound and outbound wires. An electric pulse shot along these wires and if any sensor was tripped or broken, the circuit would break and trigger the alarm. To overcome this, the Monster carefully stripped the wire's plastic coating and attached a piece of new wire to the exposed copper wiring, shunting the circuit and ensuring that it was irrelevant if the sensors were tripped. 
 Heat sensors were blinded with Styrofoam boxes and light sensors with tape. The men worked in darkness, having memorised the layout of the vault. They would occasionally flick on their lights for a brief moment to position their drill over the lock boxes.
 The King of Keys used a hand-cranked drill to break the locks on each of the security boxes. The contents were then emptied into duffel bags.
 At 5:30am they finished and left, returning to the office building (a process which took almost an hour due to the need for caution). They then put the bags in Notarbartolo's car, which then drove to the apartment while the men headed there on foot.

The group was caught after Notarbartolo and Speedy went to dispose of the evidence of their plans, planning to burn it in France. Speedy was overcome with panic at the prospect of transporting such incriminating evidence and insisted they dispose of it in a nearby forest. However, Speedy suffered a panic-attack and disposed of the evidence poorly, hurling it into the bushes and mud rather than burning it. Notarbartolo was busy burning his own evidence and when he discovered what Speedy had done, he decided it would take too long to gather everything up and they needed to leave, confident that nobody would find their rubbish. A local hunter owned the land and called the police when he found the rubbish the next day (believing it to be caused by local teenagers he had previously had disputes with). When he mentioned that some of the rubbish consisted of envelopes from the Antwerp Diamond Centre, the police immediately investigated. The evidence from the rubbish was enough to allow the police to gain a lead and they were eventually able to identify Notarbartolo from security footage from a nearby grocery store where he had purchased a sandwich (a receipt for the sandwich was amongst the rubbish).
 
After the robbery, Notarbartolo and his team stole the security footage to conceal their identities. More than 123 out of 160 safe deposit boxes were forced open, each of which was made of steel and copper and had both a key lock and combination lock.

Perpetrators
The theft was carried out by a five-man team led by Leonardo Notarbartolo, a professional thief who was skilled in social manipulation. Notarbartolo had rented space in the diamond district, and was arrested after being connected to the crime by DNA evidence from a partially eaten salami sandwich found near the crime scene.

In addition to Notarbartolo, the team consisted of at least four other members, whom Notarbartolo gave aliases during interviews, though he refused to specify whom each alias referred to:
 Speedy - described as an anxious and paranoid man, he was a long-time friend of Notarbartolo and was the one responsible for scattering the rubbish in the woods. Most likely the alias of Pietro Tavano.
 The Monster - described as a tall, muscular man, he was apparently an expert lockpicker, electrician, mechanic and driver and was very strong. Most likely the alias of Ferdinando Finotto.
 The Genius - a specialist in alarm systems. Most likely the alias of Elio D’Onório, an electronics expert known to be linked to series of robberies.
 The King of Keys - an older man, he was described as one of the best key forgers in the world. His true identity is unknown and he remains the only member of the crew to escape apprehension by the police.

Notarbartolo was found guilty of orchestrating the heist. He is considered to be the leader of a ring of Italian thieves called "La Scuola di Torino" (The School of Turin), who carried out the crime. He was sentenced to 10 years in prison by the court of appeal of Antwerp in 2005, but had since been released on parole in 2009. In 2011 a European Arrest Warrant was issued against him after he was found to have violated his parole conditions. One of these conditions was that he needed to compensate the victims of the heist, which he never made any attempt to do. As a consequence, he was arrested again in 2013 at the Charles De Gaulle Airport in Paris during a layover from the United States to Turin, and was made to serve the remainder of his prison sentence until 2017.

Tavano, D’Onorio, and Finotto, each, got five years in prison.

Notarbartolo's wife, Adriana Crudo, and Antonino Falletti were tried, and Falletti's Dutch wife Judith Zwiep was arrested.

Insurance fraud
Notarbartolo claimed in an interview with Wired magazine that a diamond merchant hired them for the heist. He claims that they actually stole approximately €18 million ($20 million) worth of loot, and that the robbery was part of an insurance fraud. Someone knowing the incumbent robbery could have taken the diamonds and then claimed the insurance on them, hence gaining from the insurance fraud.

Due to the fact that the vault itself was uninsured, as the insurance company realised the security flaws and would have never given it an insurance policy, there was actually very little insurance money involved, which casts doubt on his story.

Legacy
The heist is the subject of the book Flawless: Inside the Largest Diamond Heist in History by Scott Andrew Selby and Greg Campbell. Audible Original Audio Series HEIST with Michael Caine's first episode gives an overview of the heist, largely taken from the book.

The story of this diamond heist was featured on The Travel Channel's “Mysteries At The Museum” Season 13/Episode 4 titled “Project Vortex, Diamond Heist and Tinseltown, NJ”, narrated by series host Don Wildman.

The story was also featured on TV Series "History's Greatest Heists"  Season 1 / Episode 1 : titled "The Antwerp Diamond Heist", narrated by Pierce Brosnan

Paramount Pictures optioned the rights to create a film about the heist, which have since expired. It was to be produced by J. J. Abrams.

BBC World Service podcast show, The Outlook, produced an audio episode, The detective and the diamond heist, describing the incident and aftermath.

See also
 1971 Baker Street robbery
 1977 Krugersdorp bank robbery
 2005 Schiphol Airport diamond heist
 2013 Brussels Airport diamond heist
 2015 Hatton Garden safe deposit burglary

References

2003 crimes in Belgium
Diamond
Diamond
Diamond industry in Belgium
February 2003 crimes
February 2003 events in Europe
Individual thefts
Organized crime events in Belgium